Copella meinkeni is a species of fish in the splashing tetra family found in the Amazon basin within Brazil and Venezuela. They grow no more than a few centimeters.

References

External links
 

Fish of Brazil
Fish of Venezuela
Taxa named by Axel Zarske
Taxa named by Jacques Géry
Fish described in 2006
Lebiasinidae